Awatef Ben Hassine (born 5 April 1981) is a Tunisian sprinter. She competed in the women's 400 metres at the 2000 Summer Olympics.

Her time of 23.95 is the current Tunisian national record in the women's 200 metres.

References

External links
 

1981 births
Living people
Athletes (track and field) at the 2000 Summer Olympics
Tunisian female sprinters
Olympic athletes of Tunisia
Place of birth missing (living people)
Mediterranean Games bronze medalists for Tunisia
Mediterranean Games medalists in athletics
Athletes (track and field) at the 2001 Mediterranean Games
Olympic female sprinters
21st-century Tunisian women